United World Schools (UWS) is a UK registered charity that aims to 'teach the unreached' by building and developing community schools for out-of-school children in South East Asia. The charity operates schools in Cambodia Myanmar (Burma), and Nepal.

United World Schools have an education model whereby they partner with national governments and local communities to build schools, and also to build capacity locally so that each school can transition into government hands within seven years.
 
The charity also twins some of the community schools it develops with other schools in more affluent parts of the world. These schools help fund the UWS schools. and use the school partnership in curriculum areas such as global citizenship and International Baccalaureate studies.  Some schools also provide volunteers for the schools and visit their UWS School. Schools are also funded by donations from individuals and organisations.

To date, United World Schools has opened a total of 250 new schools, trained over 1,200 teachers and given educational opportunities to more than 43,000 previously out-of-school children across Cambodia, Myanmar and Nepal.

United World Schools regularly receives recognition and awards for its work.

Vision and Mission 
United World Schools' mission is to improve, through education, life opportunities for some of the world's poorest children living in remote and marginalised communities.

The charity's vision is for a world in which every child has the opportunity to have an inclusive, accessible and high-quality education; regardless of race, gender, disability or the location they happen to be born.

History
 
Chris Howarth, together with his family, founded UWS in 2008 after working as a volunteer teacher in Cambodia with VSO. While in Cambodia, Chris saw a need and opportunity to work with the under-resourced local authorities of Ratanakiri, NE Cambodia. Working with Cambodian volunteer Nan Sitha, Chris's daughter Anna Smuts, and colleagues from Portsmouth Grammar and Guildford Grammar school, UWS ran community engagement projects to connect the schools, uniting young people from the UK and Cambodia.

The first UWS school opened in Kong Nork School, Vernsai, Ratanakiri in 2008 and educates more than 250 ethnic minority students. Since then, the charity has expanded its operations to more remote and marginalised areas of Cambodia, as well as parts of Myanmar and Nepal, reaching over 43,000 children across all three countries.

UWS was founded in 2008 and was registered with the Charity Commission of England and Wales in May 2009.

In 2020, United World Schools launched UWS USA Inc, a 501(c)3 registered organisation, to develop their supporter base and organisational capacity in the United States.

UWS are working towards their next objective to reach a total of 250,000 out of school children by 2030.

Countries operating
 Cambodia
 Myanmar
 Nepal

References

Educational charities based in the United Kingdom
Foreign charities operating in Cambodia
Foreign charities operating in Myanmar
Foreign charities operating in Nepal